The Meinertellidae are a small family of basal insects belonging to the order Archaeognatha. They are sometimes known as rock bristletails. These insects can be distinguished from members of the other Archaeognatha family, Machilidae, by the lack of scales at the base of the legs and antennae, head, and palps; along with possession of small abdominal sternites protruding slightly between the coxal plates. They can also be distinguished by patches of reddish to violet-brown hypodermal pigment on the appendages.

Members of Archaeognatha are generally petrophilous ("rock-loving"), but species of Meinertellidae living in the Amazon has adapted to a life among the leaf litter on the forest floor, on the tree trunks and up in the canopy. In this wet environment, their eggs have a tolerance for being submerged in water.

Meinertellidae comprise more than 170 species in 19 genera, grouped into the Machiloides group, Machilinus group, Hypomachiloides group, Machilontus group, and Meinertellus group.

Distribution 
These insects are principally found in the southern hemisphere, and can be found in rain forests, regular forests, and on coastal cliffs.

Taxonomy 

 †Cretaceobrevibusantennis Chen and Su, 2017; Burmese amber, Myanmar, Cenomanian
 †Cretaceomachilis Sturm & Poinar, 1998; Lebanese amber, Barremian, Burmese amber, Myanmar, Cenomanian
 †Glaesimeinertellus Sánchez-García et al., 2019; Lebanese amber, Barremian
 Macropsontus Silvestri, 1911; Lebanese amber, Barremian, Burmese amber, Myanmar, Cenomanian
 Neomachilellus Wygodzinsky, 1953; Neotropics, fossils known from Miocene Dominican and Chiapas ambers.
 †Nullmeinertellus Zhang et al., 2018; Burmese amber, Myanmar, Cenomanian
 †Unimeinertellus Zhang et al., 2018; Burmese amber, Myanmar, Cenomanian

See also
ITIS page on Meinertellidae
Basal hexapods

References

Insect families
Archaeognatha